Jalan Puchong–Petaling Jaya (Selangor state route B11) is a major road in Klang Valley regions, Selangor, Malaysia

List of interchanges

External links
 www.BandarPuchong.com Bandar Puchong Community Online 

Roads in Selangor